Alibabavum 40 Thirudargalum may refer to:

 Alibabavum 40 Thirudargalum (1941 film)
 Alibabavum 40 Thirudargalum (1956 film)